The Roman Catholic Church in Vietnam comprises solely a Latin rite hierarchy, joint in a national episcopal conference, comprising three metropolitan archdioceses and 24 suffragan dioceses.

There are no Eastern Catholic, (missionary) pre-diocesan or other exempt jurisdictions.

There are no titular sees, all defunct jurisdictions have current Latin successor sees.

There formally is an Apostolic Delegation to Vietnam as papal diplomatic representation (non-residential, below embassy-level), but it is vested in the Apostolic Nunciature to Singapore.

Current Latin dioceses

Ecclesiastical Province of Hà Nội 
 Metropolitan Archdiocese of Hà Nội
Diocese of Bắc Ninh
Diocese of Bùi Chu
Diocese of Hà Tĩnh
Diocese of Hải Phòng
Diocese of Hưng Hóa
Diocese of Lạng Sơn and Cao Bằng
Diocese of Phát Diệm
Diocese of Thái Bình
Diocese of Thanh Hóa
Diocese of Vinh

Ecclesiastical Province of Huế 
 Metropolitan Archdiocese of Huế
Diocese of Ban Mê Thuột
Diocese of Đà Nẵng
Diocese of Kon Tum
Diocese of Nha Trang
Diocese of Quy Nhơn

Ecclesiastical Province of Sài Gòn 
 Metropolitan Archdiocese of Hồ Chí Minh City (Saigon)
Diocese of Bà Rịa
Diocese of Cần Thơ
Diocese of Đà Lạt
Diocese of Long Xuyên
Diocese of Mỹ Tho
Diocese of Phan Thiết
Diocese of Phú Cường
Diocese of Vĩnh Long
Diocese of Xuân Lộc

See also 
 List of Roman Catholic dioceses of Asia
 Catholic Church in Vietnam
 Catholic Bishops' Conference of Vietnam

Sources and external links
 GCatholic.org.
 Catholic-Hierarchy entry.

Lists of Roman Catholic dioceses by country
Catholic dioceses